HangTime is a steel roller coaster at Knott's Berry Farm in Buena Park, California. The Infinity Coaster was manufactured by Gerstlauer on the former site of Boomerang and Riptide. On opening, it had the steepest drop on a rollercoaster in California, at 96°. HangTime was also marketed by the park as the first Dive Coaster in California. It opened on May 18, 2018.

History
On August 16, 2017, Knott's Berry Farm announced that they would be adding HangTime. It would be the second Gerstlauer Infinity Coaster in the United States, with the first one being The Monster at Adventureland in Altoona, Iowa.

Vertical construction of HangTime began in November 2017 with the lift hill supports rising. 

In January 2018, the track layout was complete. HangTime performed its first test runs two months later in March 2018. Much like The Smiler at Alton Towers, the trains would have four rows that carry 16 riders.

HangTime opened to season passholders on May 11, 2018, and to the general public a week later on May 18, 2018.

Theme
The theme of the ride is a throwback to the days of surfing the California coast in the 1960s. Most of the ride is surf or nautical themed.

Ride experience
The train leaves the station and starts climbing the  vertical lift hill. Upon reaching the top, the train is held for five seconds before plunging at a 96-degree angle. This inversion is similar to a Norwegian loop, except the train enters a non-inverted dive loop followed by a sidewinder before exiting in the opposite direction. The train moves through a corkscrew and a cutback. Following the cutback, the train goes through a small ejector airtime hump. The train then enters a cobra roll located in front of the negative-g stall loop. After exiting the cobra roll, the train passes the on-ride camera, which takes photos of the riders. The train slows down on the brake run, turns left and heads back into the station.

Photo Gallery

References

Roller coasters in California
Roller coasters operated by Cedar Fair